is a railway station in Nishi-ku, Kumamoto, Japan. It is on the Kagoshima Main Line of JR Kyushu and the Kikuchi Line of Kumamoto Electric Railway. In front of the station is a tram stop of the tram operated by Kumamoto City Transportation Bureau named Kami-Kumamoto-Ekimae Station.

Lines 

Kyushu Railway Company
Kagoshima Main Line
Kumamoto Electric Railway
Kikuchi Line

Environs 

Kumamoto City Transportation Bureau: Kami-Kumamoto-Ekimae tram stop
Kumamoto Castle
Kumamoto Prefectural Gymnasium
Kyōmachi-Honchō Post office
Kumamoto District Meteorological Observatory
Honmyōji Temple
Kumamoto University Elementary School and Junior High School
Kumamoto City Kyōryō Junior High School
Kumamoto City Iseri Junior High School

Railway stations in Japan opened in 1891
Railway stations in Kumamoto Prefecture